Dugesia aborensis is a species of freshwater triclad found in the Abor Hills, Arunachal Pradesh, India.

Dugesia aborensis was originally described as Planaria aborensis by Whitehouse. In 1928, Meixner changed the genus to which it more likely belongs.

Because there is no description of D. aborensis copulatory apparatus, it should be considered as species inquirenda.

Description
D. aborensis, like all the other Dugesia species, has a triangle-shaped head with two auricles on each side. The dorsal side of the body has a light brown color, with a darker line running in the middle line along the length of the body, from the neck to the posterior end. At the root of the pharynx, at about the middle of its course, this line expands into a broad patch. The ventral surface has a milky white color. They have two eyes in two pigment free-patched areas in the middle of the head. This species was described on the basis of animals without male reproductive organs and without genital aperture. However, the ovaries were detected between the anterior branches of the gut. The analysis of the D. aborensis specimens sections revealed no oviduct or uterus.

Ecology
D. aborensis has been found under stones in a hill-stream.

Reproduction
It has been proposed that D. aborensis reproduces asexually during the summer, while sexually from autumn. However, no sexual mature specimens have been found. It has also been proposed that this is a dioecious species, but all continenticola species known until now are hermaphroditic.

References

Dugesia